The 2012 AAMI Classic took place between 11–14 January 2012, at the Kooyong Stadium in Melbourne, Australia.

Lleyton Hewitt was the defending champion, having defeated Gaël Monfils 7–5, 6–3 in the 2011 final, but he competed in the Apia International instead. Following Jo-Wilfried Tsonga's withdrawal, Sam Querrey and Victor Troicki agreed to play in an exhibition match to help fill the schedule. Andy Murray and David Nalbandian also played a match.

Bernard Tomic won in the final against Mardy Fish, 6–4, 3–6, 7–5. He became the youngest person (and first teenager) to win the event.

Seeds

Draw

Main draw

Play-offs

References

External links
Official AAMI Classic website

Kooyong Classic
AAMI Classic